The Roman Catholic Diocese of Ales-Terralba is located in Sardinia, Italy. It is a suffragan of the Archdiocese of Oristano.

History
Gregory the Great alludes to the episcopal see of Ales (anciently Uselli), in his letter to Januarius of Cagliari in 591. After this nothing is to be found about it until 1147, when the name of Bishop Rello appears in a diploma. The local traditions of Terralba have preserved the memory of a Bishop Mariano, who erected the cathedral about 1144.

The diocese of Ales and the diocese of Terralba were united by Pope Julius II, in 1503.

It would appear that a process has begun to permanently unite the diocese of Ales-Terralba and the archdiocese of Oristano. The Bishop of  Ales-Terralba, Roberto Carboni, O.F.M. Conv., was promoted on 4 May 2019 to be Archbishop of Oristano and on the same date was appointed Apostolic Administrator of his former diocese of Ales-Terralba.  However, on 3 July 2021, without losing his position as Archbishop of Oristano, he was reappointed Bishop of Ales-Terralba. The announcement specifies that this act unifies the two dioceses in persona Episcopi ('in the person of the Bishop').

Ordinaries

Diocese of Ales
Erected: 7th Century
Pedro Garcia (21 Jul 1484 – 14 Jun 1490 Appointed, Bishop of Barcelona)
Juan Crespo, O.S.A. (2 Oct 1493 – )

Diocese of Ales e Terralba
Diocese of Ales united with Diocese of Terralba: 8 December 1503
Latin Name: Uxellensis et Terralbensis
Metropolitan: Archdiocese of Oristano

Pedro del Frago Garcés (6 Nov 1562 – 20 Dec 1566 Appointed, Bishop of Alghero) 
Miguel Maigues, O.S.A. (13 Dec 1568 – 1584 Died) 
Pedro Clement, O. Carm. (23 Jan 1585 – 1601 Died) 
Antonio Surredu (13 Aug 1601 – Aug 1605 Died) 
Lorenzo Nieto y Corrales Montero Nieto, O.S.B. (17 Apr 1606 – 12 Aug 1613 Appointed Bishop of Alghero)
Diego de Borja, O.F.M. (26 Aug 1613 – 1616 Died) 
Gavino Manconi (30 May 1616 – 1634 Died) 
Melchiorre Pirella (7 May 1635 – 1638 Died) 
Miguel Beltrán Castellón (13 Sep 1638 – 1644 Died) 
Antonio Manunta (18 Apr 1644 – Oct 1662 Died) 
Giovanni Battista Brunengo (13 Aug 1663 – Nov 1679 Died) 
Serafino Esquirro (15 Jul 1680 – 1681 Died) 
Domenico Cugia (10 Apr 1684 – 1693 Died) 
Francesco Masones y Nin (2 Jan 1693 – 15 Sep 1704 Appointed Archbishop of Oristano) 
Isidoro Masones y Nin (15 Dec 1704 – Jan 1724 Died) 
Salvatore Ruyu (17 Mar 1727 – Jan 1728 Died) 
Giovanni Battista Sanna (14 Jun 1728 – Jan 1736 Died) 
Antonio Giuseppe Carcassona (26 Sep 1736  – 1 May 1760 Died) 
Giuseppe Maria Pilo, O. Carm. (25 May 1761 Confirmed – 1 Jan 1786 Died) 
Michele Antonio Aymerich de Villamar (15 Sep 1788 – 23 Jul 1806 Died) 
Giuseppe Stanislao Paradiso (29 Mar 1819 – 4 Sep 1822 Died) 
Antonio Raimondo Tore (28 Jan 1828 – 2 Oct 1837 Confirmed Archbishop of Cagliari) 
Pietro Vargiù (22 Jul 1842 – 3 Aug 1866 Died) 
Francesco Zunnui Casula (22 Feb 1867 – 16 Jan 1893 Appointed Archbishop of Oristano)
Palmerio Garau (12 Jun 1893 – 27 Mar 1906 Died) 
Francesco Emanuelli (29 Aug 1910 – 10 Oct 1947 Died) 
Antonio Tedde (5 Feb 1948 – 6 Aug 1982 Died) 
Giovanni Paolo Gibertini, O.S.B. (23 Mar 1983 – 11 Jul 1989 Appointed Bishop of Reggio Emilia-Guastalla) 
Antonino Orrù (9 Apr 1990 – 5 Feb 2004 Retired) 
Giovanni Dettori (5 Feb 2004 – 10 Feb 2016 Retired)
Roberto Carboni, O.F.M. Conv. (10 Feb 2016 – 4 May 2019 Appointed Archbishop of Oristano)
Roberto Carboni, O.F.M. Conv. (3 Jul 2021 – Appointed additionally Bishop of Ales-Terralba)

Notes

Ales-Terralba
Ales-Terralba